Pink Privacy is a 173-page collection of poems by American artist Jessica Yatrofsky published in 2017 by Conveyor Arts with original artwork by Alphachanneling. The book consists of around 200 short poems.

Background
Pink Privacy was the debut collection of poems published by Yatrofsky. In Yatrofsky's Pink Privacy, sexual desire and sick burns form language simultaneously comedic, sad, and ferociously sensual. Yatrofsky's poems draw from high-minded art school theory to schoolyard taunts. The lesson of Pink Privacy is pity to those who have fucked its author.

Credits
Artwork by Alphachanneling .

Words by
Jessica Yatrofsky

Reception
Forbes remarked that “In Pink Privacy, the feminine reigns supreme” while New York Magazine remarked that Pink Privacy was a comedic rebuttal to the oh-so-serious nature of the art world, while still a work of literary art in its own right and i-D  mentioned that “Pink Privacy is a revelatory approach to the form”.  Nylon Magazine remarked that Pink Privacy, is Jessica Yatrofsky's first foray into the realm of poetry writing and is guaranteed to start a conversation. with poems that have a high level of sexual frankness.

References 

2017 poetry books
American poetry collections